Lomsdal–Visten National Park is a Norwegian national park that was established on 26 June 2009. It is located in Nordland county, Norway, and covers parts of the municipalities of Brønnøy, Vevelstad, Grane, and Vefsn.

The landscape is dominated by great diversity and many rivers. There are steep-sided fjords with deciduous woodlands, coniferous forests, mountainous terrains, and alpine peaks.  The rich and varied geology was another reason for protecting the area. Karstic terrain with caves, subterranean rivers, arches, and unusual weathering are found here.

History
Cultural heritage relics have been found that date from the Mesolithic period (8000–9000 years ago) up to the present
day. Traces of Sámi culture can be found in the national park dating from the time when the Sámi were hunters
and gatherers up to their modern semi-domesticated reindeer husbandry.

Farms that were abandoned due to the Black Death were re-cleared from 1500 to 1800 by ethnic Norwegians who expanded into the Sámi areas. They cleared farms along the fjords, the larger valleys, and far into the mountains.  Traces of how they used the area can be seen near the farms and on outlying land.

The Second World War also left its mark in the Lomsdal-Visten area, and an annual march goes from inner Visten to Eiterådalen to commemorate wartime events.

Activities allowed 

 Visitors are allowed to pick wild berries and mushrooms. 
 Undue noise is prohibited in the national park.

References

National parks of Norway
Protected areas established in 2009
Protected areas of Nordland
2009 establishments in Norway
Brønnøy
Vevelstad
Grane, Nordland
Vefsn